Applied Mathematics and Mechanics (English Edition) is a peer-reviewed journal of mechanics, established in 1980 by Wei-zang Chien in 1980. Chien was the editor-in-chief from 1980 to 2002 and subsequently an honorary editor-in-chief. Xingming Guo is the editor-in-chief now.  In 1980, it was quarterly, became bimonthly in 1981, and then monthly in 1985.

Abstracting and indexing 
The journal is abstracted and indexed in the following bibliographic databases:

According to the Journal Citation Reports, it has a 2016 impact factor of 1.205.

References

External links 
 

Publications established in 1980
Monthly journals
English-language journals